is a Japanese long-distance runner. He competed in the 5000 metres event at the 2015 World Championships in Athletics in Beijing, China. His twin brother, Kenta, competed in the 10,000 metres.

International competitions

Personal bests

References

External links
 
 
 
 

1993 births
Living people
Place of birth missing (living people)
Josai University alumni
Japanese male long-distance runners
Olympic male long-distance runners
Olympic athletes of Japan
Athletes (track and field) at the 2016 Summer Olympics
Asian Games competitors for Japan
Athletes (track and field) at the 2014 Asian Games
World Athletics Championships athletes for Japan
Japan Championships in Athletics winners
Sendai University Meisei High School alumni
Japanese twins
Twin sportspeople